Sardolutra ichnusae is an extinct species of otter from the Late Pleistocene of Sardinia. It was originally described as Nesolutra ichnusae. It was a rather small species of otter, probably living in the sea. Among its characteristics is a relatively very large baculum, larger than in any living otter. 
The species probably evolved from a species of Lutra, maybe L. castiglionis.

References 

Prehistoric mustelids
Pleistocene carnivorans
Otters
Prehistoric mammals of Europe
Prehistoric monotypic mammal genera
Pleistocene genus extinctions
Fossil taxa described in 1992
Prehistoric carnivoran genera